Euptera ducarmei is a butterfly in the family Nymphalidae. It is found in the north-eastern part of the Democratic Republic of the Congo and the Central African Republic.

References

Butterflies described in 1998
Euptera